Henry Kissinger (born 1923) is an American diplomat.

Kissinger may also refer to:

People
 Bill Kissinger (1871–1929), American Major League Baseball player
 C. Clark Kissinger (born 1940), American communist
 Eric Kissinger (born 1986), American soccer player
 Jessica Kissinger, American biologist and geneticist
 Kakai Kissinger (born 1975), Kenyan human rights activist
 Meg Kissinger, American investigative journalist
 Nancy Kissinger (born 1934), American philanthropist and wife of Henry Kissinger

Other uses
 Kissinger: A Biography, a 1992 book by Walter Isaacson
 Kissinger, full name "Please Note We Are No Longer Accepting Letters of Recommendation from Henry Kissinger", an episode of Law & Order: Criminal Intent, season 7